Akhisar railway station was a station in Akhisar, Turkey. Built in 1890 by the Smyrna Cassaba Railway, it remained in service until 2018, when a new station on the outskirts of the city. The station was closed on 20 April 2018 and the tracks were torn up shortly after, to much criticism.  

The station was opened in 1890, by the Smyrna Cassaba Railway.

References

External links
Station information
Station timetable

Railway stations in Manisa Province
Railway stations opened in 1890
1890 establishments in the Ottoman Empire
Akhisar District